The Corridors of Time is a science fiction novel by the American writer Poul Anderson that was first published in 1965 as a serial in Amazing Stories May–June 1965 and as a book by Doubleday.

Background
The Corridors of Time alternates between the European Stone Age and a repressive future. In its vision of tomorrow, almost everyone is either an agricultural serf or an industrial slave, but the rulers genuinely believe that they are creating a better world. Set largely in Denmark, it treats the Neolithic society with knowledge and respect but does not hide its own faults. It is there that the protagonist, having access to literally all periods of the past and future, finally decides to settle down and finds a happy and satisfying life.

Characters 
 Malcolm Lockridge, a man of the twentieth century who is sent to prison after an accidental murder and is released to join the Warden camp 
 Storm Darroway, leader of the Warden faction (eastern hemisphere in the future)
 Brann, leader of the Ranger faction (western hemisphere in the future)
 Auri, Neolithic character
 Withucar, Neolithic character
 Jesper Fledelius, 17th-century Danish follower of Warden Queen Storm
 Mareth known as Marcus Nielsen, hedge row priest and Warden war lord
 John and Mary, continental advisors in a future in which there is no camp guard or gendarmes

References

External links 
 
 The Corridors of time by Poul Anderson, SF Book.com, 2 March 2001.

1965 American novels
1965 science fiction novels
American science fiction novels
Novels by Poul Anderson
Novels about time travel
Novels first published in serial form
Temporal war fiction
Works originally published in Amazing Stories
Novels set in Denmark